Shri Santaji Jagnade Maharaj (1624–1688) was one of fourteen cymbal players employed by Shri Tukaram Maharaja, a prominent Marathi Sant. Jagnade wrote their own Abhangs and also recorded several of Tukaram's Abhangs, He belonged to the Teli caste of oil producers. Jagnade was born and brought up in Sadumbare in the Maval tehsil in the Pune District. He was a Varkari, a devotee of Lord Vittala (or Vithobā), an incarnation of Lord Krishna, who in turn, is considered in Hinduism to be an incarnation of Lord Vishnu. A stamp commemorating Jagnade was released in February 2009 by the Indian Postal Service.

Life

Sant Santaji Jagnade Maharaj was born in 8th Dec 1624 in Chakan village, near Dehu, in Khed tehsil of Pune District, Maharashtra.
He was born to a pious, dutiful and God loving couple Shri Vithoba Pant Mathabai.
Chakan was a famous market place. Santaji’s father Vithobapant Jagnade was engaged in the avocation of producing edible oil. Santaji grew up in a serene and blessed rural atmosphere. He also continued his ancestral business. As per the prevalent social custom of the times, he was married at the age of twelve to Yamuna and continued his business. But after marriage, he became disinterested in family life and materialistic pursuits and turned to spiritual solace through religious discourses. He took to Kirtans and Bhajans and decided to renounce all worldly pleasures to attain the sublime. Finally he left home abandoning his parents and wife.

In the company of Tukaram Maharaj, he began to write psalms, Santaji became a shadow of Tukaram Maharaj, a true spiritual companion in his religious voyage. Through his writing, he awakened the spiritual consciousness of his contemporaries. The people felt indebted to him for his devotional writings. Santaji’s Abhangs are glorified verses which illustrate his literary skills and talents.

Efflorescence of his poetic skills are evident in his poems “Shankar Deepika”, “Yogachi Wat” Nirgunachya Lavnya. “Tel Sindhu” etc. During this period arose a religious upheaval against Tukaram’s “Gatha’ from the orthodox class. Some anti-social destroyed the manuscripts of Tukaram’s “Gatha” by throwing them into the lndrayani River. Santaji was greatly pained by this boorish act and resolved to rewrite the Abhangs from his and other’s memories and restore their original glory. He accomplished this self-imposed duty by penning down his recollections of the Abhangs as far as he could remember. He toured all over Maharashtra and visited each and every village to collect copies of whatever the spiritual disciples and followers of Tukaram had noted down from his Abhangs. He made people recite the Abhangs, they had memorized and wrote them down. Santaji being the original writer of the Manuscript of Tukaram’s Gatha, it was easier for him to recapitulate the Abhangs from his memory. Thus by undertaking the laborious duty of putting bits together, he recreated Tukaram’s Gatha as recited by Tukaram and gave it a rebirth. This was the second edition of the ‘Gatha” rewritten by the original writer Santaji. Tukaram’s Gatha” lost under the waves of lndrayani, rose again to take its rightful place in the hearts of the sea of masses not because of the blessings of Goddess Saraswati alone, but due to the painstaking efforts and boundless devotion and endeavour of Santaji.

Teachings
Santaji’s teachings were as valuable as that of other Saints. He was illumined soul who believed in the universality of love and compassion. His famous preachings are As Below
(1) Avoid unhealthy competitions 
(2) Never discriminate man from man
(3) Never be egoistic or a victim of jealousy or worldly pride
(4) Guide your actions to benefit humanity and welfare of mankind
(5) Give importance to people’s welfare
(6) Earn wealth through right paths and spend liberally
(7) Never despise others, be compassionate. 
Santaji preached such noble and universally true words of wisdom. In the ultimate analysis the philosophy and preaching of Santa Tukaram and Sant Jagnade were one and the same. Therefore, at this juncture of spiritual crisis, which has enveloped the whole world, it is befitting to remember and honour the great soul Santaji Jagnade, whose thoughts and philosophy remain immortal.

Legacy
Santaji's postage Stamp was published by Indian Post on 09-02-2009.

References

Indian percussionists
1624 births
1688 deaths